Zhenyuan County is a province in the east of Gansu province, China, bordering Ningxia to the west. It is under the administration of the prefecture-level city of Qingyang. Its postal code is 744500, and its population in 2018 was 528,076 people.

One of the earliest Paleolithic sites in China, Dongdonggou, was found in Zhenyuan. In the Han Dynasty it was established as Linjing County, during the Yuan dynasty it was named Yuanzhou, and during the Ming dynasty it became Zhenyuan County.

Zhenyuan is mostly dependent on cultivation of grains, vegetable oils, melons and vegetables. It also has oil reserves.

In October 2019, the Zhenyuan County Library posted images of book burning of 65 books from the library. The post attracted significant controversy on Chinese social media.

Administrative divisions
Zhenyuan County is divided to 13 towns and 6 townships.
Towns

Townships

Climate

See also
 List of administrative divisions of Gansu

References

  Official website (Chinese)

Zhenyuan County
Qingyang